The 1981–82 North Carolina Tar Heels men's basketball team represented University of North Carolina. The team played its home games in Chapel Hill, North Carolina, and was a member of the Atlantic Coast Conference.  Led by James Worthy, Sam Perkins and freshman Michael Jordan, the Tar Heels won the National Championship. It was head coach Dean Smith's first title.

Roster

Player stats

Schedule

|-
!colspan=6 style=| Regular season

|-
!colspan=6 style=| ACC Tournament

|-
!colspan=6 style=| NCAA Tournament

Awards and honors
 Michael Jordan, ACC Rookie of the Year
 James Worthy, NCAA basketball tournament Most Outstanding Player

Team players drafted into the NBA

References

North Carolina
North Carolina Tar Heels men's basketball seasons
NCAA Division I men's basketball tournament championship seasons
NCAA Division I men's basketball tournament Final Four seasons
North Carolina
Tar
Tar